The Leinster Intermediate Club Football Championship is an annual Gaelic football tournament played between the Intermediate football champions of the 12 counties of Leinster. The winners will represent the province in the semi-final of the All-Ireland Intermediate Club Football Championship.

Top winners

Winners by county

 No team from Westmeath, Carlow, Kilkenny, Offaly or Longford

Roll of honour

2010 Leinster Intermediate Club Football Championship

2011 Leinster Intermediate Club Football Championship

2015 Leinster Intermediate Club Football Championship

2016 Leinster Intermediate Club Football Championship

2017 Leinster Intermediate Club Football Championship
Games in 2017 included:

See also
 Munster Intermediate Club Football Championship
 Ulster Intermediate Club Football Championship
 Connacht Intermediate Club Football Championship

References

Leinster GAA club football competitions
2003 in Gaelic football